The 1976 Volta a Catalunya was the 56th edition of the Volta a Catalunya cycle race and was held from 8 to 15 September 1976. The race started in Amposta and finished in Sitges. The race was won by Enrique Martínez Heredia of the  team.

General classification

References

1976
Volta
1976 in Spanish road cycling
September 1976 sports events in Europe